Caxton Press is a printing company founded in 1935 in a partnership between Denis Glover and John Drew.  The press printed the work of many New Zealand writers who have since become familiar names in New Zealand literature. It originally appeared in 1932 as the Caxton Club Press. It was a University of Canterbury publication created at the height of the depression to help create an identity for the political left.

Notable poets and authors 
Janet Frame
Denis Glover
Ursula Bethell
R. A. K. Mason
Allen Curnow
Charles Brasch
Frank Sargeson
A. R. D. Fairburn
Basil Dowling

References

External links
 

Printing companies
Publishing companies established in 1935
Book publishing companies of New Zealand
New Zealand companies established in 1935